Endine Gaiano is a comune (municipality) in the Province of Bergamo in the Italian region of Lombardy, located about  northeast of Milan and about  northeast of Bergamo.

Endine Gaiano borders the following municipalities: Fonteno, Gandino, Monasterolo del Castello, Ranzanico, Solto Collina, Sovere.

References